Holocaust studies, or sometimes Holocaust research, is a scholarly discipline that encompasses the historical research and study of the Holocaust. Institutions dedicated to Holocaust research investigate the multidisciplinary and interdisciplinary aspects of Holocaust methodology, demography, sociology, and psychology. It also covers the study of Nazi Germany, World War II, Jewish history, religion, Christian-Jewish relations, Holocaust theology, ethics, social responsibility, and genocide on a global scale. Exploring trauma, memories, and testimonies of the experiences of Holocaust survivors, human rights, international relations, Jewish life, Judaism, and Jewish identity in the post-Holocaust world are also covered in this type of research.

Holocaust studies, as a separate field, was established in a 1974 meeting at the Embassy of Israel, London. Renowned Polish-British Historian Norman Davies has described how in this meeting researchers were instructed to employ anti-Polish sentiment and described all Poles as antisemites who were bystanders and participants in the Holocaust, with Poland a "a historical centre of antisemitism".

Academic research 

Among the research institutions and academic programs specializing in Holocaust research are:
 Center for Advanced Holocaust Studies at the United States Holocaust Memorial Museum in Washington, D.C.
 Center for Holocaust and Genocide Studies, University of Minnesota
 European Holocaust Research Infrastructure – it is financed by the 7th Framework Programme for Research and Technological Development of the European Union
 Fritz Bauer Institute in Frankfurt, Germany, named after the German judge and prosecutor at the Frankfurt Auschwitz trials (Fritz Bauer)
 Holocaust and Genocide Studies (journal), Oxford Academic.
 International Institute for Holocaust Research at Yad Vashem in Jerusalem, Israel
 Polish Center for Holocaust Research at the Polish Academy of Sciences in Warsaw, Poland
 Stockton University offered the first Master of Arts in Holocaust and genocide degree in the United States in 1999
 Uppsala Programme for Holocaust and Genocide Studies in Uppsala, Sweden
 Vienna Wiesenthal Institute for Holocaust Studies

Scholars 

Prominent Holocaust scholars include:
 H. G. Adler (1910–1988), a Czechoslovakian Jew who survived the Holocaust and became one of the early scholars of the Holocaust.
 Hannah Arendt (1906–1975), a German-American political theorist who is known for the term "banality of evil", used to describe Adolf Eichmann. 
 Yehuda Bauer (born 1926), a Czechoslovak-born Israeli historian and scholar on the Holocaust and antisemitism.
 Doris Bergen (born 1960), a Canadian academic and Holocaust historian.
 Michael Berenbaum (born 1945), an American scholar and rabbi who specializes in the study of the memorialization of the Holocaust. He served as Project Director of the United States Holocaust Memorial Museum in 1988–1993.
 Alan L. Berger (born 1939), the Raddock Family Eminent Scholar Chair for Holocaust Studies at Florida Atlantic University, Professor of Jewish Studies at Florida Atlantic University, Director of the Center for the Study of Values and Violence after Auschwitz, Editor and Author of Interdisciplinary Holocaust Scholarship, Co-Editor of Second Generation Voices: Reflections by Children of Holocaust Survivors and Perpetrators, and Member of the Florida Department of Education Holocaust Education Task Force.
 Christopher Browning (born 1944), an American historian of the Holocaust who is best known for his work Ordinary Men: Reserve Police Battalion 101 and the Final Solution in Poland, a study of German Reserve Police Battalion 101 that massacred Jews in Poland.
 Lucy Dawidowicz (1915–1990), among the earliest American historians of the Holocaust, whose work, including her book The War Against the Jews: 1933–1945 (1975), investigated the political and social context of the events.
 Martin Gilbert (1936–2015), a British historian who has published many historical volumes about the Holocaust.
 Alena Hájková (1924–2012), Czech Communist resistance fighter who became a chief historian on Jews in the Czechoslovak resistance.
 Raul Hilberg (1926–2007), an Austrian-born American political scientist and historian who is widely considered to be the world's preeminent Holocaust scholar.
 Raphael Lemkin (1900–1959), a Polish Jewish lawyer who coined the term genocide, which was later adopted by the United Nations in the 1948 Convention on the Prevention and Punishment of the Crime of Genocide.
 Primo Levi (1919–1987), an Italian Jewish chemist who survived Auschwitz, and later published over a dozen works. He committed suicide on April 11, 1987.
 Franklin Littell (1917–2009), a Protestant scholar who is regarded by some as the founder of the field of Holocaust studies.
 Peter Longerich (born 1955), a German professor of history, author and director of the Research Centre for the Holocaust and Twentieth-Century History at Royal Holloway, University of London.
 Léon Poliakov (1910–1997), a French historian who wrote on the Holocaust and antisemitism.
 Laurence Rees (born 1957), a British historian and documentary filmmaker.
 Gerald Reitlinger (1900–1978), a British art historian who wrote three works after World War II about Nazi Germany.
 Carol Rittner (born 1943), Distinguished Professor of Holocaust & Genocide Studies at Stockton University, who co-produced the Academy Award nominated documentary The Courage to Care, and has written a number of important works about the Holocaust and various genocides.
 Richard L. Rubenstein (1924–2021), an American scholar who is noted for his contributions to Holocaust theology.
 R.J. Rummel (1932–2014), political scientist and Holocaust & Genocide studies expert that coined the term Democide; professor at the Indiana University, Yale University, and finished his career at the University of Hawaiʻi.

Education about the Holocaust 

Education about the Holocaust or Holocaust education refers to efforts, in formal and non-formal settings, to teach about the Holocaust. Teaching and Learning about the Holocaust (TLH) addresses didactics and learning, under the larger umbrella of education about the Holocaust, which also comprises curricula and textbooks studies. The expression "Teaching and Learning about the Holocaust" is used by the International Holocaust Remembrance Alliance.

See also 

 Aftermath of the Holocaust
 Antisemitism
 Yehuda Bauer
 Comparisons between Israel and Nazi Germany
 Lucy Dawidowicz
 Double genocide theory
 Genocide education
 Geography of antisemitism
 Martin Gilbert
 Gratz College – a college which is best known for its Holocaust and Genocide studies programs which offer both M.A. degrees and PhD's in the subject
 Raul Hilberg
 History of antisemitism
 History of the Jews during World War II
 Holocaust denial
 Holocaust Memorial Center, Farmington Hills, Michigan
 Holocaust Memorial Days
 Holocaust Museum Houston
 Holocaust Studies and Materials
 Holocaust trivialization
 Holocaust victims
 How Holocausts Happen – a book which deals with the genocidal policies of Nicaraguan counterrevolutionary forces and the general public's reaction to the Holocaust in Nazi Germany and German-occupied Europe
 Beate Klarsfeld
 Serge Klarsfeld
 Nora Levin
 Responsibility for the Holocaust
 Rudolph Rummel
 Secondary antisemitism
 Yaron Svoray
 Elie Wiesel
 Simon Wiesenthal
 Timeline of the Holocaust
 United States Holocaust Memorial Museum
 Yad Vashem
 Yom HaShoah
Efraim Zuroff

References

Sources

Further reading

 Engel, D. (2021). The Holocaust: The Third Reich and the Jews. Routledge.
 Feierstein, D., & Town, D. A. (2014). Discourse and Politics in Holocaust Studies: Uniqueness, Comparability, and Narration. In Genocide as Social Practice: Reorganizing Society under the Nazis and Argentina’s Military Juntas (pp. 71–86). Rutgers University Press. 
 Friedman, J. C. (Ed.). (2010). The Routledge History of the Holocaust. Routledge.
 Gutwein, D. (2009). The Privatization of the Holocaust: Memory, Historiography, and Politics. Israel Studies, 14(1), 36–64. 
 Hayes, P., & Roth, J. K. (2011). The Oxford Handbook of Holocaust Studies. Oxford University Press.
 Hirsch, M., & Spitzer, L. (2010). The Witness in the Archive: Holocaust Studies/Memory Studies. In S. Radstone & B. Schwarz (Eds.), Memory: Histories, Theories, Debates (pp. 390–405). Fordham University Press.
 Hudzik, J. P. (2020). Reflections on German and Polish Historical Policies of Holocaust Memory. The Polish Review, 65(4), 36–59.
 LaCapra, D. (1994). Representing the Holocaust: History, Theory, Trauma. Cornell University Press.
 Libowitz, R. (1990). Holocaust Studies. Modern Judaism, 10(3), 271–281. 
 Littell, F. H. (1980). Fundamentals in Holocaust Studies. The Annals of the American Academy of Political and Social Science, 450, 213–217.
 Rittner, C., & Roth, J. K. (2020). Advancing Holocaust Studies. Routledge.

External links 
 Center for Holocaust and Human Rights Education at Florida Atlantic University, Encouraging the Next Generation of Holocaust Researchers
 Elie Wiesel Foundation for Humanity
 European Holocaust Research Infrastructure
 Florida State Commissioner of Education's Task Force on Holocaust Education
 Resources for Academics and Research at the United States Holocaust Memorial Museum
 Yad Vashem

 
The Holocaust